PlayStation Official Magazine – Australia is a video games magazine published by Future Australia.

The magazine's origin dates back to the original PlayStation console. The magazine was called "Official Australian PlayStation Magazine". As the era changed, it would be rebranded as "Official PlayStation 2 Magazine-Australia". Finally, to coincide with the release of the PlayStation 3, it was rebranded again as "PlayStation Official Magazine – Australia". The magazine's title is often abbreviated to OPM.

Staff
 Editor: Adam Mathew
 Staff Writer: Adam Guetti
 Art Director: Stephanie Goh
 Contributors: James Cottee, Dan Staines, Paul Taylor, James Ellis, Dave Kozicki, Toby McCasker, Nathan Lawrence, Martin Gladstone and Clint McCreadie
 Graphic Design: Ryan Stuart
 Creative Director: Paul Cook
 'Resident Evil': "Angry Sackboy"

Structure
The regular sections of OPS are:

 Intro - Editor and staff explain what has been happening in that month
 Insider - Recent PlayStation news, as well as smaller sub-sections that include a mock movie based on a game, a Top 10 with a subject that changes each month, a calendar of events, various competitions and more
 Inbox - Each month a "Letter of the Month" wins the game of the month.
 Cuttings - Snippets of letters or extremely short letters that cannot work as letter by themselves.
 OPS Facebook Page - material posted by readers on the OPS Facebook fan page. Official PlayStation Magazine - Australia Facebook Fan Page
 Subscriptions
 Incoming - Previews of games, both hands-on and first looks, that are as of the date of printing unreleased or unreviewed. This covers all PlayStation branded games, including PS3, PS2 and PSP.
 Indepth - Longer previews that usually tie in interviews with game developers and publishers
 Inreview - Reviews of all current PlayStation games. Titles are given a score out of 10. Those that are rated 10/10 receive a 'gold award', 9/10 a silver, 8/10 a bronze.
 Internet - The online portion of the magazine recommends various demos and videos on the PlayStation Store, as well as Downloadable content and the online component of PS3 games.
 Insight - Provides hints and tips for games, as well as a list of activities recommended specifically for recent games. The list may include 'Easter Eggs' (Easter egg (media)), highlights of various stages or gameplay moments.
 Intermission - Blu-ray, DVD and cinema reviews. Includes new releases and a recently added Anime section.
 Index - Titled 'All the games that matter', this section lists the "must have" titles for all PS3 owners. It has four categories that broadly encapsulate the genres of games available. The categories are Adventure, Shooter, Racing and Music & Sports.
 The Best PSN Games - a column with six of the best PlayStation Network games available.
 The Best PSP Games - a column with six of the best PSP games available.
 Magic Moments - a column that details a special moment in a game in the PlayStation library.
 Top Five - this column changes each month, detailing in a humorous manner 'top five' things about games, for example the 'top five shameless videogame rip-offs'.
 Infamous - a retrospective of a notable PlayStation title.
 Insane - subtitled "It should be a game", this section lampoons established game franchises and notable figures and characters.

External links
Techmags Site

2007 establishments in Australia
Computer magazines published in Australia
Magazines established in 2007
PlayStation (brand) magazines
Monthly magazines published in Australia
Video game magazines published in Australia